Sakina Samo is a Pakistani actress, producer and director.

Career

Sakina Samo began her acting career in regional television plays and radio dramas in Pakistan. Her breakthrough screen performance in Deewarain, a social-drama examining honor killings in Pakistani society, saw her receive the first of her best actress nominations.  Sakina continued to deliver performances that amassed both critical and commercial acclaim. After an extended break, Sakina returned to the screen in 2000 to act, produce and direct several award-winning dramas. In 2011, she received the Tamgha-e-Imtiaz in recognition of her work in the Pakistani entertainment industry. In 2014, she directed her fifth collaboration with Pakistani writer Umera Ahmad, Mohabat Subh Ka Sitara Hai which has received both critical and commercial acclaim. Most recently, she directed and produced her first feature film, Intezaar (English: Waiting) which will be released in 2022.

Filmography

Awards

References

External links
 

Living people
People from Jamshoro District
Recipients of Tamgha-e-Imtiaz
20th-century Pakistani actresses
Year of birth missing (living people)
Sindhi people
Pakistani film actresses
Recipients of the Pride of Performance
21st-century Pakistani actresses
PTV Award winners